Russian Multi-Purpose Salvage Vessels are group of three classes of ships – MPSV06, MPSV07 and MPSV12. The class of MPSV06 ships are the biggest ones but all the classes are relatively large rescue and salvage vessels.

MPSV06 
MPSV06 class vessels are a series of three icebreaking salvage vessels, one of which is being built in Russia and two that have been ordered from the German shipbuilder Nordic Yards Wismar (Ship design company JSC "Nordic Engineering" took part in the development of this project, in 2019 JSC "Nordic Engineering"  modernized  it contract project  and approved by the Russian Maritime Register of Shipping).

The first vessel of the class, tentatively named Spasatel Petr Gruzinskiy, was reportedly laid down at Amur Shipbuilding Plant in Komsomolsk-on-Amur, Russia, already in 2010, but the construction was later suspended. In December 2018, it was reported that the United Shipbuilding Corporation would complete the unfinished third vessel which reportedly has a technical readiness of about 40 %. In February 2020, Amur Shipbuilding Plant was reportedly "ahead of schedule" and the vessel, now named Kerchenskiy Proliv, was launched on October 30, 2020.

The second and third vessels, Beringov Proliv and Murman, were laid down in November 2013 at Nordic Yards and launched in September 2014. Both ships were delivered in December 2015.

The ice class of the vessels, assigned by the Russian Maritime Register of Shipping, is Icebreaker6. They will have two large cranes, for salvage, and a landing platform for helicopters. They will be capable of operating remotely operated underwater vehicles, and will have decompression facilities sufficient to support a team of deep divers.

MPSV07 

MPSV07 class vessels are a series of four icebreaking salvage vessels, which were delivered between 2012 and 2015. The lead vessels of Project MPSV07, Spasatel Karev, was put into operation on 25 October 2012; the second ship, Spasatel Kavdejkin – on 19 July 2013, the third ship, Spasatel Zaborshchikov – on 17 December 2013. The fourth ship, Spasatel Demidov, was ordered later separately and therefore was commissioned two years later than the 3rd ship – on 4 December 2015.

The vessels are 73 m long and deadweight at maximum draft is approximately 1,171 t. The vessels has a sea endurance of 20 days. The vessels are equipped with machinery to investigate the sea bed and damaged objects lying in depths of up to 1,000 m. MPSV07 class can also perform underwater diving operations to depths as low as 300 m.

MPSV12 
MPSV12 class vessels are a series of four icebreaking salvage vessels, which are to be delivered between 2017 and 2018. This class of vessels are bigger than MPSV07 class of vessels but smaller than MPSV06 class vessels. The vessels are about 80 m long and deadweight at maximum draft is approximately 1,820 t. The first two ships, Bakhtemir and Kalas, were laid down on 2 June 2015.

Operational history 
The Spasatel Demidov was called upon to control a fire aboard two LNG carriers, in the Sea of Azov, on January 21, 2019. Despite throwing water on both the ships, fire continued for three to five days or more.

List of Russian Multi-Purpose Salvage Vessels

References

External links 
 
 
 
 
 
 
 

Icebreakers of Russia